The 1970 Brown Bears football team was an American football team that represented Brown University during the 1970 NCAA University Division football season. Brown tied for last in the Ivy League. 

In their fourth season under head coach Len Jardine, the Bears compiled a 2–7 record and were outscored 217 to 112. G. Hart and B. O’Donnell were the team captains. 

The Bears' 1–6 conference record tied for seventh in the Ivy League standings. They were outscored by Ivy opponents 196 to 85. 

Brown played its home games at Brown Stadium in Providence, Rhode Island.

Schedule

References

Brown
Brown Bears football seasons
Brown Bears football